Qarloq or Qarleq may refer to:
 Qarleq, Kermanshah
 Qarloq, Markazi
 Qarloq, North Khorasan
 Qarloq, Zanjan
 Qarloq, Abhar, Zanjan Province

See also
 Karluk (disambiguation)
 Qarluq, Iran (disambiguation)